The FAJ Jastreb Vuk-T often called Vuk (Serbian:Vuk - Wolf) is a Standard Class single-seat high-performance glider, intended for transition training, designed and built in the Yugoslavia from the late 1970s.

Design and development

Designed by Prof. Dr. Tomislav Dragović at the Faculty of Mechanical Engineering, Aero Engineering Institute, University of Belgrade, the Vuk-T was manufactured by FAJ Jastreb in Vršac entirely from fiberglass. After manufacture the gliders were first tested by the JRV and JNA before donation to state-sponsored aero clubs across the country.

Permitted to do the following aerobatic manoeuvres: loop, stall turn, steep turn and spin, the Vuk-t is popular in flying clubs because it reminds club members about free flying, the free donation of planes to clubs by the army and general Yugoslavian nostalgia. The majority of surviving Vuk-t gliders fly with aero-clubs with few aircraft in private ownership and are expected to have a long life due to the high structural strength and ease of maintenance.

One peculiar attribute of the VUK-T can be characterized by a whistling sound when flying, often described as the howl of a wolf, (vuk meaning wolf in some languages used by peoples of the former Yugoslavia).

Specifications (Vuk-T)

Notes

References

External links
Vuk-T Handbook (in Serbian)

Glider aircraft
1970s Yugoslav sailplanes
T-tail aircraft